Paul Yule may refer to:

 Paul Yule (photojournalist) (born 1956), photojournalist and film maker
 Paul Alan Yule, German archaeologist

See also
 Paul Youll (born 1965), English science fiction and fantasy artist